Ayette is a commune in the Pas-de-Calais department in northern France.

Geography
A farming village located 9 miles (14 km) south of Arras at the junction of the D7 and D919 roads.

Population

Sights
 L'Église Sainte-Libaire, rebuilt after 1918, along with the rest of the village.
 The CWGC maintains two cemeteries: The British Cemetery and the Indian and Chinese cemetery. There is also a British Cemetery in Douchy-lès-Ayette, about a kilometer to the west.

See also
Communes of the Pas-de-Calais department

References

External links

 The CWGC war cemeteries at Ayette

Communes of Pas-de-Calais